Whydah may refer in English to:

 Whydah, one of a number of species of birds in the family Viduidae, also called indigobirds
 Whydah Gally, a ship captained by pirate "Black Sam" Bellamy that was wrecked in 1717 and was discovered in 1984
 Whydah (ship)
 Ouidah, city and colonial fort in present Benin
 Kingdom of Whydah, which included Ouidah but was headquartered in Savi